Christopher Vose (27 January 1887 – 22 August 1970) was an English cross-country runner. He finished 19th in the individual cross-country race at the 1920 Summer Olympics and fourth among British runners, and therefore did not score for the silver medal-winning British team. He also competed at the International Cross Country Championships in 1911–13 and 1920–21 and won one individual silver and five team gold medals.

References

1887 births
1970 deaths
Sportspeople from Preston, Lancashire
English male long-distance runners
Olympic athletes of Great Britain
Athletes (track and field) at the 1920 Summer Olympics
Olympic cross country runners